Save Chase Farm was a local British political party that stood against the closure of departments of Chase Farm Hospital, Enfield.
 
Save Chase Farm's leaders were Catherine Wilkinson and Kieron McGregor. They were both elected as local councillors to Enfield Council in May 2006. The party fielded nine candidates in the 2006 local council election. In the May 2010 elections both Wilkinson and McGregor stood again but both lost their seats to the Conservatives. As a political party, they disbanded after the 2010 election but continued to campaign against the closure of the maternity and A&E units of the hospital. They persuaded the council to obtain a Judicial review of the closure. This was unsuccessful; the units closed and redevelopment of the hospital now continues under the administration of the Royal Free London NHS Foundation Trust. The "Save Chase Farm" website does not appear to have been updated since 2010.

References

Political parties established in 2006
Locally based political parties in England
Politics of London
Political parties disestablished in 2010